You Wrote It, You Watch It was an MTV sketch comedy show that aired in the 1992-1993 season. It was hosted by Jon Stewart, and featured members of the State comedy troupe prior to their being given their own show by MTV.

The State troupe performed humorous sketch recreations of letters sent to the MTV offices by viewers, depicting outrageous stories and events from their daily lives, with introductions by Stewart.

An early example of crowdsourcing, the show only lasted one season, premiering in 1992 and being canceled in 1993. Jon Stewart would later quip, "You wrote it, you just didn't watch it!"

References

External links

1992 American television series debuts
1993 American television series endings
1990s American sketch comedy television series
English-language television shows
MTV original programming
Jon Stewart